Deurningen is a village in the Dutch province of Overijssel. It is a part of the municipality of Dinkelland, and lies about 5 km northeast of Hengelo.

Overview 
It was first mentioned in 1295 as Thornengen. The etymology is unclear. In 1787 a church was built, and the village developed around the church. The current church was completed in 1912. In 1840, it was home to 719 people. In 2001, 97 houses in Deurningen were transferred to the municipality of Oldenzaal.

Gallery

References

Populated places in Overijssel
Twente
Dinkelland